Cuneisigna rivulata is a moth of the family Noctuidae first described by George Hampson in 1902. It is found in  Kenya and South Africa.

References

Catocalinae
Moths of Africa
Moths described in 1902